Şadan Derya Erke (born November 11, 1983) is a Turkish former swimmer, who specialized in backstroke events. She is a two-time Olympian (2000 and 2004) and a member of Istanbul Swimming Club. She previously held Turkish records in the 50, 100, and 200 m backstroke, until they were all broken by Hazal Sarikaya in 2012. Erke is also a graduate of Marmara University in Istanbul.

Erke made her first Turkish team, as a 16-year-old teen, at the 2000 Summer Olympics in Sydney. There, she failed to reach the semifinals in any of her individual events, finishing forty-second in the 100 m backstroke (1:07.26), and twenty-ninth in the 200 m backstroke (2:21.28).

At the 2004 Summer Olympics in Athens, Erke maintained her program on her second Olympic appearance, competing again in the 100 and 200 m backstroke. She posted FINA B-standard entry times of 1:04.28 (100 m backstroke) and 2:19.11 (200 m backstroke) from the European Championships in Madrid, Spain. In the 100 m backstroke, Erke challenged six other swimmers in heat two, including 14-year-olds Anastassiya Prilepa of Kazakhstan and Olga Gnedovskaya of Uzbekistan. She raced to third place and thirty-fourth overall by 0.23 of a second behind Thailand's Chonlathorn Vorathamrong with a time of 1:05.38. In the 200 m backstroke, Erke shared a twenty-first place tie with Italy's Alessia Filippi from the morning's preliminaries. Swimming in the same heat as her first, she posted a lifetime best of 2:17.29 to claim another third spot by a 3.22-second margin behind winner Evelyn Verrasztó of Hungary.

References

1983 births
Living people
Turkish female swimmers
Olympic swimmers of Turkey
Swimmers at the 2000 Summer Olympics
Swimmers at the 2004 Summer Olympics
Female backstroke swimmers
Sportspeople from Istanbul
Marmara University alumni
21st-century Turkish women